Jason R. Reitman (born October 19, 1977) is a Canadian-American actor and filmmaker, best known for directing the films Thank You for Smoking (2005), Juno (2007), Up in the Air (2009), Young Adult (2011), and Ghostbusters: Afterlife (2021). He has received one Grammy Award, one Golden Globe, and four Academy Award nominations, two of which are for Best Director. Reitman is a dual citizen of Canada and the United States. He is the son of director Ivan Reitman, and known for frequently collaborating with screenwriter Diablo Cody.

Early life
Reitman was born in Montreal, Quebec, the son of Geneviève Robert, an actress sometimes billed as Geneviève Deloir, and Hungarian-Jewish film director Ivan Reitman (1946–2022). Reitman has two younger sisters: Catherine Reitman, an actress, producer and writer, who is three years younger, and Caroline Reitman, a nurse, who is 12 years younger.

Reitman's father was born in Czechoslovakia, to Jewish parents who were Holocaust survivors. Reitman's paternal grandfather ran a dry cleaner and then a car wash.

His mother is from a Christian background and of French-Canadian descent; she converted to Judaism. When he was still a child, his family moved to Los Angeles.

His father, Ivan, directed the films Ghostbusters, Ghostbusters II, Stripes, and Kindergarten Cop. Reitman grew up on set, and has photos of himself as a baby on the set of Animal House in 1978; Bill Murray described Reitman as "a pain in the ass" while filming Ghostbusters, with Dan Aykroyd joking that "he was directing back then". Such experiences showed him that making movies is "a job that people do, that it's not just this piece of magic that happens".

Jason described his childhood self as "a loser... a movie geek... [and] shy." In the late 1980s, Reitman began appearing in small acting parts and serving as a production assistant on his father's films. He spent time in the editing rooms of his father's movies, learning the process.

Reitman graduated from Harvard-Westlake School in 1995; Reitman was a high jumper in high school, coached by Occidental College Hall-of-Famer Phil Sweeney.

Reitman attended Skidmore College and was going to major in pre-med studies before transferring to the University of Southern California (USC) to major in English/Creative Writing. At USC he performed with improv group Commedus Interruptus.

Film career
Reitman started out making short films during his time at USC. Throughout his 20s, instead of accepting offers to make commercial feature films, Reitman began making his own short films and directing commercials. Although he was offered the opportunity to direct Dude, Where's My Car? on two occasions, he declined.

Reitman's first feature film, Thank You for Smoking, opened in 2005. Reitman developed the Christopher Buckley novel into a screenplay and, eventually, a film. The film was a commercial and critical success. It grossed over $39 million worldwide by the end of its run, and was nominated for two Golden Globes. After the success of Thank You for Smoking, Reitman mentioned in an interview that his next film would be adapting another book (a "white collar satire") into a film. He also mentioned that he had plans to work with Buckley again on an original project. Although the first of these projects would eventually become Up in the Air, this second project has not come to fruition.

His second film, Juno, generated great buzz after it premiered at the 2007 Toronto International Film Festival and was released in December 2007. It was Roger Ebert's favorite film of 2007 and received Oscar nominations for Best Picture, Elliot Page's performance as the title character, Diablo Cody's original screenplay, and Reitman himself for Best Director. Reitman did win other awards for his work on Juno, including Best Director at the 2008 Canadian Comedy Awards. The film grossed over $140 million at the U.S. box office, making it the largest success of Reitman's career and more successful than any of his father's films since Kindergarten Cop. Brad Silberling was originally attached to direct the film, but he dropped out over casting differences. Reitman was in the middle of writing a screenplay when he came on board to direct Juno and, at one point, he expressed intent to finish writing and to direct this screenplay.

In March 2006, Reitman formed the production company "Hard C Productions" with producing partner Daniel Dubiecki. The company had an overall deal with Fox Searchlight Pictures, the company that distributed Reitman's first two films. Reitman described his production company's goal as being to produce "small subversive comedy that is independent but accessible". Reitman states that he and Dubiecki "want to make unusual films, and anything that turns a genre on its ear". Through Hard C Productions, Reitman is set to produce and direct Banzai Shadowhands, a comedy about "a once-great ninja who is now living a life of mediocrity". Shadowhands will be written by The Offices Rainn Wilson. Reitman met Wilson on the set of his father's film My Super Ex-Girlfriend, in which Wilson had a supporting role. No start date for filming has been set, and it is unclear as to whether or not Wilson is finished with the script.

Hard C Productions produced films The Ornate Anatomy of Living Things and Jennifer's Body. Anatomy has been written by Matthew Spicer and Max Winkler, and will revolve around "a Gotham bookstore clerk who discovers a museum devoted to his life". Jennifer's Body is a horror comedy written by Diablo Cody and starring Megan Fox, about a cheerleader who is possessed by a demon and starts feeding off the boys in a Minnesota farming town. In 2009, Reitman left Hard C to form Right of Way Films.

In 2001, the year the novel Up in the Air was published, Sheldon Turner discovered the book and wrote a screenplay adaptation, which he sold to DreamWorks in 2003. Jason Reitman later came upon the novel (initially attracted by the Christopher Buckley blurb on the cover) while browsing in the Los Angeles bookstore Book Soup. Reitman persuaded his father Ivan Reitman to purchase the book's film rights, and the elder Reitman commissioned a screenplay from Ted and Nicholas Griffin, who used some elements from Turner's script in their own work. Jason Reitman then developed his own screenplay, incorporating some of the elements from the Griffins' script that had (unbeknownst to Reitman) originated with Turner. Some of Turner's inventions that were utilized in the final film include Ryan's boilerplate termination speech ("Anyone who ever built an empire or changed the world sat where you're sitting right now..."), a key plot point involving a suicide, and the character of Ryan's partner (written by Turner as male).

Reitman initially attempted to claim sole credit for writing the film, and later admitted to being confused when the Writers Guild of America ruled that he should share credit with Turner. He and Turner later appeared at a WGA event where both said they were happy to share credit now that the course of events, and Turner's contribution to the final product, had been made clear.

In the spring of 2009, Reitman directed Up in the Air starring George Clooney. Up in the Air is based on a novel written by Walter Kirn about a corporate downsizer who travels from city to city and is fanatical about collecting his ten millionth frequent flier mile. The film features real-world characters cast from the ranks of the recently downsized. "Hidden within a film that seems to be about corporate termination and the economy is a movie about the decision whether to be alone or not," noted Reitman," in an interview conducted just prior to the film's nationwide release. Sheldon Turner and Reitman's Up in the Air screenplay won the Golden Globe Award for best screenplay in 2010.

Reitman was also an executive producer of the erotic thriller Chloe, theatrically released by Sony Pictures Classics on March 26, 2010. Reitman helped persuade Amanda Seyfried to star in the film. The film enjoyed commercial success and became director Atom Egoyan's biggest moneymaker ever.

On January 15, 2019, Reitman announced he would be working on Ghostbusters: Afterlife, a continuation of the original Ghostbusters films directed by his father. Originally set for a June 2021, release, due to the COVID-19 pandemic the release date was pushed back to November 11, 2021. After the success of the film, both Reitman and the movie's writing partner Gil Kenan had signed an overall deal with Sony Pictures Entertainment to develop more projects. Reitman will produce and co-write a sequel to Afterlife, set for release in 2024.

Other work
Before his feature film career began, Jason Reitman wrote and directed six short films. He financed his first short film, "Operation", with money he made by selling ads in desk calendars. The film premiered at the Sundance Film Festival in 1998.

He was a guest on The Howard Stern Show on April 10, 2008; when he was asked if he would direct Ghostbusters III and cast Howard, he said "Do you know how many times I get asked if I want to do Ghostbusters III? Looking at my career so far, I mean, if you just looked at my two films, I would make the most boring Ghostbusters movie. It would just be people talking about ghosts, there wouldn't be any ghost-busting in it." Stern, a friend of Ivan Reitman, also revealed that he had seen Jason's early short films and was impressed enough to offer him the opportunity to direct an episode of Son of the Beach (a TV series he produced, a goofy parody of Baywatch), which Jason declined, citing that he was busy obtaining financing for Thank You for Smoking at the time.

Reitman produced and directed the 2007 holiday season commercials for Wal-Mart with advertising agency Bernstein-Rein. He has also directed ads for Burger King, Nintendo, BMW, and Buick. In television, Reitman directed two episodes of The Office entitled "Local Ad" and "Frame Toby". Reitman also directed a three-part pretaped sketch for the NBC show Saturday Night Live called "Death by Chocolate," about a walking candy bar, played by episode host Ashton Kutcher, who murders people; stabbing a homeless man, shooting a doctor, cutting off a life support machine on a coma victim, and slicing Andy Samberg (dressed as a lumberjack) with a chainsaw.

Since 2011, Reitman directs the Live Read series, a monthly live staged reading of film scripts as part of the Film Independent at LACMA.

In 2020, Reitman directed The Princess Bride, a television adaption of novel of the same name for Quibi featuring an ensemble cast to raise money for World Central Kitchen.

Personal life
Reitman is a self-described libertarian.

When Reitman was 16 and still in high school he moved in with a woman 10 years his senior. They separated after 7 years.

In 2000, when he was 23, Reitman started dating his next-door neighbor, writer Michele Lee, with whom he co-wrote the 2004 comedic short "Consent." They married and have one child, a daughter named Josie, born in 2006. After being together 10 years, Reitman filed for divorce in June 2011 and was divorced .

FilmographyProducer only Jennifer's Body (2009)
 Jeff, Who Lives at Home (2011)Executive producer'''
 Chloe (2009)
 Ceremony (2010)
 Whiplash (2014)

Short films

Television

Acting credits

Awards and nominations

References

External links

 
 Interview with Jason Reitman about Juno at the Telluride Film Festival, September 10, 2007
 Interview with Jason Reitman about Thank You for Smoking and Juno''EyeForFilm.co.uk
 Ubben Lecture at DePauw University; March 15, 2010 (includes video clips)
 Jason Reitman's Guest DJ Set  on KCRW

1977 births
American libertarians
American male screenwriters
American people of French-Canadian descent
American people of Slovak-Jewish descent
Anglophone Quebec people
Best Adapted Screenplay BAFTA Award winners
Best Screenplay Golden Globe winners
Canadian libertarians
Canadian emigrants to the United States
Canadian male child actors
Canadian male film actors
Canadian male screenwriters
Canadian people of Slovak-Jewish descent
21st-century Canadian screenwriters
Film directors from Montreal
Grammy Award winners
Harvard-Westlake School alumni
Independent Spirit Award winners
Jewish American male actors
Jewish Canadian male actors
Living people
Male actors from Montreal
Reitman family
University of Southern California alumni
Writers from Montreal
Film directors from Los Angeles
Screenwriters from California
Canadian Comedy Award winners
21st-century American Jews
Comedy film directors